David Atlee Phillips (October 31, 1922 – July 7, 1988) was a Central Intelligence Agency officer of 25 years and a recipient of the Career Intelligence Medal. Phillips rose to become the CIA's chief of operations for the Western hemisphere. In 1975 he founded the Association of Former Intelligence Officers (AFIO), an alumni association comprising intelligence officers from all services.  

Phillips was repeatedly accused of involvement in the JFK assassination, named by both investigators and Agency family members. The House Select Committee on Assassinations investigated accusations from Cuban exile Antonio Veciana that he
Phillips had met Lee Harvey Oswald. In 1980, a book by Donald Freed and Fred Landis was released accusing him of involvement. Phillips sued them for libel. In 1986, they settled for an undisclosed amount and retracted the allegations.

Early life and military career
Phillips was born in Fort Worth, Texas and attended The College of William and Mary in Williamsburg, Virginia and Texas Christian University in Fort Worth. Phillips was an actor prior to World War II. During the war, he served as a nose gunner in the United States Army Air Forces. He was shot down over Austria and captured by the Germans, but was able to escape and make it back to Allied lines.

CIA career
Phillips joined the CIA as a part-time agent in 1950 in Chile, where he owned and edited The South Pacific Mail, an English-language newspaper that circulated throughout South America and several islands in the Pacific. He became a full-time operative in 1954, and operated a major psychological warfare campaign in Guatemala during the US coup and its aftermath. He rose through the ranks to intelligence officer, chief of station and eventually chief of Western hemisphere operations, serving primarily in Latin America, including Cuba, Mexico, and the Dominican Republic. Phillips retired from the agency in 1975 and founded the Association of Former Intelligence Officers in the same year.

House Select Committee on Assassinations
While investigating Lee Harvey Oswald's possible ties to certain pro- and anti-Castro radical groups around the time of the assassination of President John F. Kennedy, an HSCA staff investigator (Gaeton Fonzi) reported being told by anti-Castro paramilitary organization Alpha 66 founder Antonio Veciana that Veciana arrived for a meeting in Dallas, TX with Phillips and Lee Harvey Oswald was there finishing his own conversation in the hallway with Phillips.  The HSCA investigator claimed Veciana knew Phillips as "Maurice Bishop".  After one former CIA case officer (who had been assigned to the JM/WAVE station in Miami) stated to investigators that Phillips had been known to use the alias, the commission subpoenaed Veciana to testify on  Phillips as "Bishop". Veciana stated twice under-oath that Phillips was not Bishop.   

In 2014, at a conference named The Warren Report and the JFK Assassination: Five Decades of Significant Disclosures, Veciana reversed his previous statements, asserting unequivocally, albeit not under oath, that he believed that the agent he knew as Bishop had in fact been David Atlee Phillips.

Conspiracy allegations and lawsuit
In their 1980 book Death in Washington, authors Donald Freed and Fred Landis charged that the CIA was involved in the 1973 Chilean coup d'état and the 1976 assassination of Orlando Letelier. The authors specifically named Phillips as being involved in a cover-up of the assassination and reiterated Fonzi's claim that Phillips served as Oswald's case officer while using the alias "Maurice Bishop". In 1982, Freed, Landis, and their publisher were named in a $230 million libel suit by Phillips and the AFIO. A settlement was reached in 1986 with Phillips receiving a retraction and an unspecified amount of money. Phillips donated these proceeds to AFIO for the purpose of creating a legal defense fund for American intelligence officers who felt they were the victims of libel.

After the death of former CIA agent and Watergate figure E. Howard Hunt in 2007, Saint John Hunt and David Hunt revealed that their father had recorded several claims about himself and others being involved in a conspiracy to assassinate John F. Kennedy. In the April 5, 2007 issue of Rolling Stone, Saint John Hunt detailed a number of individuals implicated by his father including Phillips, as well as Lyndon B. Johnson, Cord Meyer, David Sánchez Morales, Frank Sturgis, William Harvey and an assassin he termed "French gunman grassy knoll" who many presume was Lucien Sarti. The two sons alleged that their father cut the information from his memoirs, "American Spy: My Secret History in the CIA, Watergate and Beyond", to avoid possible perjury charges. Hunt's widow and other children told the Los Angeles Times that the two sons took advantage of Hunt's loss of lucidity by coaching and exploiting him for financial gain. The newspaper said it examined the materials offered by the sons to support the story and found them to be "inconclusive."

Later life
Phillips wrote and lectured frequently on intelligence matters. He authored seven books, including his CIA memoir The Night Watch, Careers in Secret Operations: How to Be a Federal Intelligence Officer, The Terror Brigade, The Carlos Contract, and The Great Texas Murder Trials: A Compelling Account of the Sensational T. Cullen Davis Case, Secret Wars Diary: My Adventures in Combat Espionage Operations and Covert Action,  Writing For Pleasure and Profit in Retirement: How to Enjoy A Second Career as A Professional WriterHe also published David Atlee Phillips Papers, 1929-1989 and had his wife submit them to the Library of Congress after his death. These papers include manuscripts, correspondence, drafts of books, articles and other material relating to Phillips career.

Personal life

Phillips was the brother of writer James Atlee Phillips and the uncle of musician Shawn Phillips.  

In 1948, he married Helen Hausman Haasch. They had four children, then divorced in 1967. 

In 1969, he married Virginia Pederson Simmons who had three children from a previous marriage. The couple had one child together.

Phillips died at his home in Bethesda, Maryland from complications of cancer on July 7, 1988, at the age of 65. He was buried in Arlington National Cemetery.

Publications
Books
 The Night Watch: 25 Years of Peculiar Service. New York: Atheneum (1977). . .
 The Carlos Contract: A Novel of International Terrorism. New York: Macmillan (1978). . .
 The Great Texas Murder Trials: A Compelling Account of the Sensational T. Cullen Davis Case. New York: Macmillan (1979). . .
 Careers in Secret Operations: How to be a Federal Intelligence Officer. Frederick, MD: University Publications of America (1984). . .
Writing for Pleasure and Profit in Retirement: How to Enjoy a Second Career as a Professional Writer. Bethesda, MD: Stone Trail Press (1986). . .
The Terror Brigade (novel). New York: Berkeley Publishing Group (1989). . .
 Secret Wars Diary: My Adventures in Combat, Espionage Operations and Covert Action''.  Bethesda, MD: Stone Trail Press (1988).. .

Legal proceedings
 Freed Donald v Phillips David Atlee. Civil Action No. 81-1407 & 81-2578.
 Deposition (Mar. 25, 1983)
 Deposition (Mar. 30, 1983)

See also
Bay of Pigs Invasion
Operation 40
Felix Rodriguez
Richard M. Bissell, Jr. 
Guillermo Hernández-Cartaya
Porter Goss

References

Further reading
 Report of the Select Committee on Assassinations of the U.S. House of Representatives (Mar. 29, 1979)

External links
David Atlee Phillips at Arlington Cemetery
 David Atlee Phillips at The Weisberg Collection
 David Atlee Phillips at WorldCat
 David Atlee Phillips collection (part 1) (part 2) at the Harold Weisberg Archive via Internet Archive

1922 births
1988 deaths
American escapees
American spies
American prisoners of war in World War II
CIA activities in Lebanon
College of William & Mary alumni
Escapees from German detention
People associated with the assassination of John F. Kennedy
People of the Central Intelligence Agency
Shot-down aviators
Texas Christian University alumni
United States Army Air Forces officers
United States Army Air Forces personnel of World War II
World War II prisoners of war held by Germany